
Guafo Island is an island located southwest of Chiloé Island and northwest of Chonos Archipelago, Chile. This location and the prevailing westerly winds bring frequent rainstorms to the island. Ocean currents bring an abundance of fish into this area, making it one of the most productive marine areas in the Southern Pacific Ocean. Because of this, numerous marine vertebrates such as fur seals, sea lions and penguins come to the island to feed and reproduce.

Biodiversity 
Guafo Island is characterized by a high biodiversity that includes the largest breeding colony of South American fur seals (Arctophoca australis) on Chilean coasts, a large population of South American sea lions (Otaria byronia), and a reproductively active population of marine otters (Lontra felina), a critically endangered species. Recently the coasts of the island have been indicated as an important feeding area of blue whales (Balaenoptera musculus), Southern right whale (Eubalaena australis), humpback whales (Megaptera novaeangliae) and transient killer whales (Orcinus orca). Among seabird highlights is the largest breeding colony of sooty shearwater (Puffinusgriseus) in the world (Reyes-Arriagada et al. 2007) as well as important nesting sites of Magellanic penguins (Spheniscus magellanicus) and occasional sightings of Humboldt penguins (Spheniscus humboldti). Historical data also shows that the Island was within the itinerary of the Beagle in 1835. Guafo Island has been considered within areas that are critical for marine conservation by the Wildlife Conservation Society (WCS) and the World Wildlife Fund (WWF).

Lighthouse
The lighthouse was built in 1907 by George Slight and its  rotating 4-man crews who serve 4 months on station is the only permanent population in the island. The lighthouse itself is only 8 meters tall, but the light is 144 meters above the sea.

Climate

References

External links
 Faro Isla Guafo, Chile

Islands of Chiloé Archipelago
Lighthouses completed in 1907
Lighthouses in Chile
South American sea lion colonies